The Civic Aquarium of Milan (Acquario Civico di Milano in Italian) is an aquarium in Milan, Italy, and the third oldest aquarium in Europe. Built in 1906 on the occasion of the Milan International, It is the only surviving building from the event. Sited on the edge of Sempione Park, the aquarium has over 100 different types of underwater life located in several tanks with a particular attention for the fishes and aquatic vegetation of the Italian seacoasts, lakes, and rivers.

The facade of the aquarium includes a Neptune statue, the Roman god of water and the sea, created by sculptor Oreste Labò.

The aquarium library, which is open to the public, has one of Italy’s most prestigious collection of marine biology publications.

Gallery

References

External links

Museums in Milan
Aquaria in Italy
World's fair architecture in Italy
Tourist attractions in Milan
Art Nouveau architecture in Milan